The High Commission of New Zealand in Ottawa (in Māori: Te Kāinga Māngai Kāwanatanga o Aotearoa i Ottawa) is located in Ottawa, Ontario, Canada on Elgin Street in Downtown Ottawa and serves residents and tourists from New Zealand.

New Zealand also maintains a consulate-general in Vancouver.

See also
 Canada–New Zealand relations

External links
New Zealand High Commission in Ottawa

New Zealand
Ottawa
Canada–New Zealand relations